Jacques Michaud (born 11 July 1951) is a French former professional road bicycle racer, who won the eighteenth stage in the 1983 Tour de France. In that stage, he climbed the Col des Aravis, the Col de la Colombière and the Col de Joux Plane first, and finished with an advantage of 66 seconds on the next cyclist.

Michaud rode the Tour de France five times; he completed the course all five times, and his best result in the general classification was 18th.

Major results

1979
Étoile de Bessèges
1983
Tour de France:
Winner stage 18
Cluses

References

External links 

Official Tour de France results for Jacques Michaud

1951 births
Living people
People from Saint-Julien-en-Genevois
French male cyclists
French Tour de France stage winners
Sportspeople from Haute-Savoie
Cyclists from Auvergne-Rhône-Alpes